Dylan A. Fernandes is a State Representative currently serving in the Massachusetts House representing Martha's Vineyard, the Elizabeth Islands, four precincts of Falmouth, and Nantucket. He has been serving since 2017 and is a member of the Democratic Party.

Born in Falmouth, Massachusetts Fernandes graduated from College of Charleston in 2013. He then served as Maura Healey's political director on her campaign for Attorney General in Massachusetts in 2014. After the election, he worked in the Massachusetts Attorney General's office in civil rights where he worked on cases combatting discrimination. He ran for office in 2016 in a five-way primary and won by 13 percentage points and then faced a three-way general election which he also won by 13 percentage points.

Early life
Fernandes is a fourth-generation resident of Falmouth, Massachusetts, and grew up in Woods Hole, Massachusetts. He is the son of Tessa Lineaweaver of Woods Hole who owns Flying Pig Pottery and of Mario Fernandes of Falmouth who owns a small landscaping company. Fernandes's paternal great grandparents came to Massachusetts from the Azores and Puerto Rico.

Other
Fernandes was accused of making sexist and homophobic statements as a teenager. He later apologized to a newspaper.

Education 
Fernandes first attended school at American University in Washington, D.C. He transferred to the College of Charleston and graduated there, earning a Bachelor of Science degree and majors in economics and political science. In 2022, he graduated with a Masters in Public Administration from the Harvard Kennedy School.

Career 
In 2012, Fernandes worked on Senator Elizabeths Warren's campaign in his native Cape Cod region. Fernandes served as political director for Maura Healey, Attorney General of Massachusetts in 2014. He then went on to work as digital director in the Attorneys' General office. His work there included founding pro-LGBT rights events and women's rights. He also founded the 'Everyone Welcome' campaign to support the bill for transgender rights.

In 2017, Fernandes made his maiden speech on combatting climate change and compelled the House of Representatives to vote for his bill signing Massachusetts onto the Paris Climate Agreement. The bill passed 146-10.

2016 State Representative election 

In 2016, Fernandes ran for the Massachusetts House representing precincts 1, 2, 5 and 6, of Falmouth, in Barnstable County; Chilmark, Edgartown, Aquinnah, Gosnold, Oak Bluffs, Tisbury and West Tisbury, all in Dukes County; Nantucket, Nantucket County. Fernandes was endorsed by democratic Senator Elizabeth Warren. He was elected on November 8, 2016, running only against independents.

Electoral history

See also
 2019–2020 Massachusetts legislature
 2021–2022 Massachusetts legislature

References

External links
 Legislative website
 Constituent services website
 Campaign website

Year of birth missing (living people)
Living people
American LGBT rights activists
Hispanic and Latino American state legislators in Massachusetts
Democratic Party members of the Massachusetts House of Representatives
People from Falmouth, Massachusetts
21st-century American politicians
College of Charleston alumni
Harvard Kennedy School alumni
American people of Azorean descent
American people of Puerto Rican descent